Nad Narimani (born April 14, 1987) is an English mixed martial artist. He was the formal Cage Warriors Fighting Championship featherweight champion and he competed in the Featherweight division of the Ultimate Fighting Championship.

Mixed martial arts career

Early career 
Narimani started his professional mma career in 2011 and he won the Cage Warriors Fighting Championship featherweight championship against Paddy Pimblett in April 2017 with a record of 10-2 period he signed with the UFC.

Ultimate Fighting Championship 
Narimani was scheduled to make his UFC debut on a short notice on  March 17, 2018 at UFC Fight Night: Werdum vs. Volkov against Nasrat Haqparast, replacing injured Alex Reyes. The bout was scrapped on the day of the event as Haqparast was deemed unfit to fight by the medical team due to an infectious eye condition.

Narimani's UFC debut was rescheduled on July 22, 2018 against Khalid Taha at UFC Fight Night: Shogun vs. Smith.  He won the fight via unanimous decision.

Narimani was scheduled to face Enrique Barzola on November 17, 2018, at UFC Fight Night: Magny vs. Ponzinibbio. However, Barzola was pulled from the event and he was replaced by Anderson dos Santos. He won the fight via unanimous decision.

Narimani next faced Mike Grundy on March 16, 2019 at UFC Fight Night: Till vs. Masvidal.
 Narimani lost the fight via TKO in the second round.

Narimani was scheduled to face Nik Lentz at UFC Fight Night: Blaydes vs. dos Santos on January 25, 2020. However, Narimani pulled out of the fight citing injury and was replaced by Arnold Allen.

Narimani faced Grant Dawson on July 19, 2020 at UFC Fight Night: Figueiredo vs. Benavidez 2. He lost the fight via unanimous decision. He was subsequently released by the UFC.

Personal life 
Narimani is married with two children and is of Iranian heritage. He spent time helping in his father's Middle-Eastern restaurants in his spare time before turning to be a professional MMA fighter.

Titles and accomplishments

Mixed martial arts 
 Cage Warriors Fighting Championship
 Cage Warriors Fighting Championship Featherweight Champion (One time)

Mixed martial arts record 

|-
|Loss
|align=center|12–4
|Grant Dawson
|Decision (unanimous)
|UFC Fight Night: Figueiredo vs. Benavidez 2 
|
|align=center|3
|align=center|5:00
|Abu Dhabi, United Arab Emirates
|
|-
|Loss
|align=center| 12–3
|Mike Grundy
|TKO (punches)
|UFC Fight Night: Till vs. Masvidal
|
|align=center| 2
|align=center| 4:42
|London, England
|
|-
|Win
|align=center| 12–2
|Anderson dos Santos
|Decision (unanimous)
|UFC Fight Night: Magny vs. Ponzinibbio
|
|align=center| 3
|align=center| 5:00
||Buenos Aires, Argentina
|
|-
|Win
|align=center| 11–2
|Khalid Taha
|Decision (unanimous)
|UFC Fight Night: Shogun vs. Smith
|
|align=center| 3
|align=center| 5:00
|Hamburg, Germany
|
|-
|Win
|align=center| 10–2
|Paddy Pimblett
|Decision (unanimous)
|Cage Warriors Fighting Championship 82
|
|align=center| 5
|align=center| 5:00
|Liverpool, England
|
|-
|Win
|align=center| 9–2
|Daniel Requeijo
|Submission (guillotine choke)
|Cage Warriors Fighting Championship 76
|
|align=center| 3
|align=center| 1:21
|Newport, Wales
|
|-
|Win
|align=center| 8–2
|Jeremy Petley
|TKO (punches)
|BAMMA 23
|
|align=center| 1
|align=center| 2:26
|Birmingham, England
|
|-
|Loss
|align=center| 7–2
|Alex Enlund
|Decision (unanimous)
|Cage Warriors Fighting Championship 73
|
|align=center| 5
|align=center| 5:00
|Newcastle upon Tyne, England
|
|-
|Win
|align=center| 7–1
|Benjamin Brander
|Submission (rear-naked choke)
|Cage Warriors Fighting Championship 64
|
|align=center| 1
|align=center| 4:53
|London, England
|
|-
|Win
|align=center| 6–1
|Athinodoros Michailidis
|Submission (rear-naked choke)
|Cage Warriors Fighting Championship 60
|
|align=center| 1
|align=center| 3:42
|London, England
|
|-
|Loss
|align=center| 5–1
|Graham Turner
|Decision (split)
|Cage Warriors Fighting Championship 56
|
|align=center| 3
|align=center| 5:00
|London, England
|
|-
|Win
|align=center| 5–0
|Karsten Lenjoint
|Decision (unanimous)
|Fight UK 9 
|
|align=center| 3
|align=center| 5:00
|Leicester, England
|
|-
|Win
|align=center| 4–0
|Marcin Wrzosek
|Decision (split)
|Fight UK 8
|
|align=center| 3
|align=center| 5:00
|Leicester, England
|
|-
|Win
|align=center| 3–0
|Maksym Matus
|Submission (triangle choke)
|Cage Conflict 14
|
|align=center| 1
|align=center| 0:53
|Manchester, England
|
|-
|Win
|align=center| 2–0
|Alex Brunnen
|Submission (rear-naked choke)
|Tear Up 7: Murch vs. Paul
|
|align=center| 2
|align=center| 4;28
|Bristol, England
|
|-
|Win
|align=center| 1–0
|Harvey Dines
|TKO (corner stoppage)
|KnuckleUp MMA: The New Breed 7
|
|align=center| 2
|align=center| 4:42
|Somerset, England
|
|-

See also 

 List of male mixed martial artists

References

External links 
 
 

1987 births
Living people
English male mixed martial artists
English people of Iranian descent
Sportspeople of Iranian descent
Iranian male mixed martial artists
Sportspeople from Bristol
Mixed martial artists utilizing jujutsu
Mixed martial artists utilizing Brazilian jiu-jitsu
Featherweight mixed martial artists
Ultimate Fighting Championship male fighters
English practitioners of Brazilian jiu-jitsu
Iranian practitioners of Brazilian jiu-jitsu
People awarded a black belt in Brazilian jiu-jitsu